Matthew Alexander Sorinola (born 19 February 2001) is an English professional footballer who plays as a wing-back for EFL Championship club Swansea City, on loan from Belgian First Division A club Union SG.

Early life
Sorinola was born in Lambeth. He is of Nigerian descent.

Club career

Milton Keynes Dons
In 2017, Sorinola joined Milton Keynes Dons academy having previously played for Fulham's academy sides. He signed a professional deal with the club in June 2019. During the 2019–20 EFL Trophy, Sorinola made three first team appearances, against Fulham U21, Wycombe Wanderers and Newport County. He signed a new contract with MK Dons in December 2019, before joining Beaconsfield Town on loan in February 2020.

Sorinola scored his first professional goal for the club on 8 September 2020, in a 3–1 EFL Trophy win over Northampton Town. On 30 January 2021 he scored his first league goal in a 2–0 away win over AFC Wimbledon.

Union SG

On 14 May 2021, Sorinola joined newly-promoted Belgian First Division A side Union SG on a three-year deal after rejecting a new deal with MK Dons. He scored his first goal for the club on 18 September 2021 in a 2–1 home win over Zulte Waregem. 

On 24 June 2022, he joined EFL Championship club Swansea City on a season-long loan, reuniting with former coach Russell Martin.

Career statistics

References

External links

2001 births
Living people
Association football defenders
Footballers from Lambeth
English footballers
English people of Nigerian descent
Milton Keynes Dons F.C. players
Beaconsfield Town F.C. players
Royale Union Saint-Gilloise players
Swansea City A.F.C. players
English Football League players
Southern Football League players
Belgian Pro League players
English expatriate footballers
Expatriate footballers in Belgium
English expatriate sportspeople in Belgium